The 2018 Southern Conference men's basketball tournament was the postseason men's basketball tournament for the Southern Conference for the 2017–18 season. All tournament games were played at the U.S. Cellular Center in Asheville, North Carolina, from March 2 through 5, 2018.

UNC Greensboro defeated East Tennessee State in the championship game to win the tournament and receive the conference's automatic bid to the NCAA tournament.

Seeds
All ten teams in the Southern Conference were eligible to compete in the conference tournament. Teams were seeded by record within the conference, with a tiebreaker system to seed teams with identical conference records. The top six teams received a first-round bye.

Schedule and results

Bracket

See also
2018 Southern Conference women's basketball tournament

References

External links
2018 Southern Conference Men's Basketball Championship

Southern Conference men's basketball tournament
Tournament
Southern Conference men's basketball tournament
Southern Conference men's basketball tournament
Basketball competitions in Asheville, North Carolina
College sports tournaments in North Carolina
College basketball in North Carolina